Wellington Daniel Bueno (born 24 August 1995), commonly known as Bueno, is a Brazilian footballer who plays as centre back, last playing for J1 League club Kashima Antlers.

Career
In 2016, Bueno signed for J1 League club Kashima Antlers and played for them for 6 seasons before being released at the end of the 2022 season.

Club statistics
.

Honours
Kashima Antlers
J1 League: 2016
Emperor's Cup: 2016
Japanese Super Cup: 2017

Atlético Mineiro
Campeonato Mineiro: 2020, 2021

References

External links 
 
 

1995 births
Living people
Brazilian footballers
Brazilian expatriate footballers
Brazilian expatriate sportspeople in Japan
Expatriate footballers in Japan
J1 League players
J2 League players
Campeonato Brasileiro Série A players
Shimizu S-Pulse players
Vissel Kobe players
Kashima Antlers players
Tokushima Vortis players
Clube Atlético Mineiro players
Association football midfielders
Footballers from São Paulo